Nikki Grimes (born October 20, 1950) is an American author of books written for children and young adults, as well as a poet and journalist.

Background and career
Grimes was born in Harlem, New York.
In a conversation with a Reading Is Fundamental interviewer, she stated: "Books were my survival tools. They were how I got by, and how I coped with things. Books carried me away."

She has been a guest lecturer at international schools in Sweden, Tanzania, China, and Russia. She has written articles for magazines such as Today's Christian Woman and Essence. Her interests and talents are diverse and include photography, fiber art, and beading.

Grimes currently resides in Corona, California, and continues to write poetry and books for children and young adults. She is on the board of directors for the National Children's Book and Literacy Alliance. Her work has earned her honors and recognition from a number of prestigious organizations.

Her novel Bronx Masquerade was named the Coretta Scott King Award book in 2002. The Coretta Scott King Award is "given to African-American authors and illustrators for outstanding inspirational and educational contributions."

In January 2017, she was awarded the Laura Ingalls Wilder Medal. "The Wilder Award honors an author or illustrator whose books, published in the United States, have made, over a period of years, a substantial and lasting contribution to literature for children." Following controversy surrounding Laura Ingalls Wilder's stereotypical portrayals of indigenous peoples and the subsequent changing of the medal's name, Grimes' work was criticized for alleged anti-semitism.

Works

Published works
Growin': a novel (1977), illustrated by Charles Lilly 
Something on My Mind (1978), art by Tom Feelings
Malcolm X: A Force for Change (1992)
From a Child's Heart (1993), illustrated by Brenda Joysmith
 Meet Danitra Brown (1994), illustrated by Floyd Cooper (Coretta Scott King Illustrator Honor Book)
 Portrait of Mary (1994)
 Come Sunday (1996), illustrated by Michael Bryant
 Wild, Wild Hair (1997), illustrated by George Cephas Ford
 Jazmin's Notebook (1998) (Coretta Scott King Author Honor Book)
 A Dime a Dozen (1998), illustrated by Angelo
 My Man Blue (1999), illustrated by Jerome Lagarrigue (Marion Vannett Ridgway Award)
 Hopscotch Love (1999), illustrated by Melodye Benson Rosales
 At Break of Day (1999), illustrated by Paul Morin
 Aneesa Lee and the Weaver's Gift (2000), illustrated by Ashley Bryan
Is It Far to Zanzibar? (2000), illustrated by Betsy Lewin
 Shoe Magic (2001), illustrated by Terry Widener
 A Pocketful of Poems (2001), illustrated by Javaka Steptoe
Under the Christmas Tree (2002), illustrated by Kadir Nelson
Danitra Brown Leaves Town (2002), illustrated by Floyd Cooper
 Stepping Out with Grandma Mac (2002), illustrated by Angelo
 C Is for City (2002), illustrated by Pat Cummings
 When Daddy Prays (2002), illustrated by Tim Ladwig
 Bronx Masquerade (2002), (Coretta Scott King Author Award) (Best Children's Book of 2002, Association of Theological Booksellers)
 Talkin' About Bessie (2002), illustrated by E.B. Lewis (Coretta Scott King Illustrator Award, Author Honor Book)
 Tai Chi Morning (2004), illustrated by Ed Young
 A Day with Daddy (2004), illustrated by Nicole Tadgell
 What Is Goodbye? (2004), illustrated by Raul Colón (ALA Notable Book)
 It's Raining Laughter, photographs by Myles C. Pinkney
 At Jerusalem's Gate, illustrated by David Frampton
 Danitra Brown, Class Clown (2005), illustrated by E.B. Lewis
 Dark Sons (2005, reissued 2010), (Coretta Scott King Author Honor Book)
 Thanks a Million (2006), illustrated by Cozbi A. Carrera
 Welcome, Precious (2006), illustrated by Bryan Collier
 The Road to Paris (2006), (Coretta Scott King Author Honor Book)
 When Gorilla Goes Walking (2007), illustrate by Shane Evans
 Oh, Brother! (2007), illustrated by Mike Benny
 Barack Obama: Son of Promise, Child of Hope (2008), illustrated by Bryan Collier (NY Times Bestseller)
 Out of the Dark: Nikki Grimes, Author at Work (2009)
 Make Way for Dyamonde Daniel (2009), illustrated by R. Gregory Christie
 Rich: a Dyamonde Daniel Book (2009), illustrated by R. Gregory Christie
 Voices of Christmas (2009), illustrated by Eric Velasquez
 A Girl Named Mister (2001)
 Almost Zero: a Dyamonde Daniel Book (2010), illustrated by R. Gregory Christie
 Planet Middle School (2011)
Halfway to Perfect (2012)
 Words with Wings (2013), Coretta Scott King honor book
Chasing Freedom (2015), illustrated by Michele Wood
Poems in the Attic (2015), illustrated by Elizabeth Zunon
Garvey's Choice (2016) Laura Ingall Wilder Award
One Last Word: Wisdom from the Harlem Renaissance (2017), various artists
The Watcher (2017), illustrated by Bryan Collier
Ordinary Hazards: a Memoir (2019)
Bedtime for Sweet Creatures (2020), illustrated by Elizabeth Zunon
Southwest Sunrise (2020), illustrated by Wendell Minor
Kamala Harris: Rooted in Justice (2020), illustrated by Laura Freeman
Off to See the Sea (2021), illustrated by Elizabeth Zunon

Awards and honors
 1993 NAACP Image Award Finalist for Malcolm X: a Force for Change
 2003 Coretta Scott King Author Award for Bronx Masquerade
 2006 NCTE Award for Excellence in Poetry for Children
 2011 Horace Mann Upstanders Award for Almost Zero: a Dyamonde Daniel Book
2012 NAACP Image Award for Barack Obama: Son of Promise, Child of Hope
 2016 Virginia Hamilton Literacy Award
2017 Myra Cohn Livingston Award for Poetry for Garvey's Choice
 2017 Laura Ingalls Wilder Medal
2017 Children's Literature Legacy Award
2018 Arnold Adoff Poetry Award for Middle Graders for One Last Word
2018 Claudia Lewis Poetry Award for One Last Word
2018 Lee Bennett Hopkins Poetry Award for One Last Word
2020 Arnold Adoff Poetry Award for Teens for Ordinary Hazards
Numerous Honor Awards and book lists including Coretta Scott King Honors; Arnold Adoff Poetry Honor; ALA Notable Books; Lee Bennett Hopkins Poetry Award Honor; Boston Globe-Horn Book Honor; Horn Book Fanfare; VOYA Non-Fiction Honor; The Lion & The Unicorn Award for Excellence in North American Poetry; International Youth Library White Ravens List; Notable Books for a Global Society.

References

External links
 
 HarperCollins
 Scholastic.com
 Simon & Schuster
 Zondervan
 2009 National Book Festival webcast
 National Children's Book & Literary Alliance Board of Directors
Spotlight on NCTE Poets: Nikki Grimes - career overview at No Water River blog

Interviews
 Reading Rockets video interview
  James Blasingame interviews Nikki Grimes
 Author interview from Preview Magazine, 2002
 Christian Standard interview
 Reading is Fundamental interview
 IRA Favorite Teacher Breakfast video
 
Lee Bennett Hopkins on the Career of Nikki Grimes on YouTube

American children's writers
People from Corona, California
Living people
1950 births
African-American writers
21st-century African-American people
20th-century African-American people